The 2018 Spain Masters (officially known as the Barcelona Spain Masters 2018) was a badminton tournament which took place at Pavelló de la Vall d'Hebron in Barcelona, Spain, from 28 August to 2 September 2018 and had a total prize of $150,000.

Tournament
The 2018 Spain Masters was the fifteenth tournament of the 2018 BWF World Tour and also part of the Spain Masters championships, which was held for the first time. This tournament was organized by Spanish Badminton Federation, and sanctioned by the BWF.

Venue
This international tournament was held at Pavelló de la Vall d'Hebron in Barcelona, Spain.

Point distribution
Below is the point distribution table for each phase of the tournament based on the BWF points system for the BWF World Tour Super 300 event.

Prize money
The total prize money for this year's tournament was US$150,000. Distribution of prize money was in accordance with BWF regulations.

Men's singles

Seeds

 Suppanyu Avihingsanon (final)
 Rasmus Gemke (champion)
 Mark Caljouw (first round)
 Jan Ø. Jørgensen (quarter-finals)
 Yu Igarashi (semi-finals)
 Pablo Abián (first round)
 Misha Zilberman (quarter-finals)
 Toby Penty (semi-finals)

Finals

Top half

Section 1

Section 2

Bottom half

Section 3

Section 4

Women's singles

Seeds

 Carolina Marín (withdrew)
 Sayaka Takahashi (quarter-finals)
 Mia Blichfeldt (final)
 Pornpawee Chochuwong (first round)
 Busanan Ongbamrungphan (quarter-finals)
 Kirsty Gilmour (semi-finals)
 Line Kjærsfeldt (semi-finals)
 Beatriz Corrales (quarter-finals)

Finals

Top half

Section 1

Section 2

Bottom half

Section 3

Section 4

Men's doubles

Seeds

 Mathias Boe / Carsten Mogensen (withdrew)
 Kim Astrup / Anders Skaarup Rasmussen (withdrew)
 Vladimir Ivanov / Ivan Sozonov (withdrew)
 Jones Ralfy Jansen / Josche Zurwonne (second round)

Finals

Top half

Section 1

Section 2

Bottom half

Section 3

Section 4

Women's doubles

Seeds

 Mayu Matsumoto / Wakana Nagahara (champions)
 Ayako Sakuramoto / Yukiko Takahata (final)
 Maiken Fruergaard / Sara Thygesen (semi-finals)
 Selena Piek / Cheryl Seinen (quarter-finals)

Finals

Top half

Section 1

Section 2

Bottom half

Section 3

Section 4

Mixed doubles

Seeds

 Marcus Ellis / Lauren Smith (final)
 Jacco Arends / Selena Piek (second round)
 Evgenij Dremin / Evgenia Dimova (quarter-finals)
 Niclas Nøhr / Sara Thygesen (champions)

Finals

Top half

Section 1

Section 2

Bottom half

Section 3

Section 4

References

External links
 Tournament Link

Spain Masters
Spain Masters
Spain Masters
Sports competitions in Barcelona
Spain Masters
Spain Masters